International Tech Park commonly called ITPL or ITPB is a tech park located in Whitefield, Bangalore, 18 km from the city centre. It is managed by Ascendas. It includes the 450,000 square foot Park Square Mall, several sporting arenas and the Vivanta by Taj hotel. It is the oldest tech park of Bengaluru and is located in Whitefield cluster. It was created as a result of a joint venture between India and Singapore in January 1994. It is a large facility, comprising 10 buildings — Discoverer, Innovator, Creator, Explorer, Inventor, Navigator, Voyager, Aviator, Pioneer Maadar, Victor and Anchor. This park provides campus facilities for multi national giants like IPsoft, General Motors, Société Générale, Mu Sigma, Xerox, Conduent, AT&T, Soais, Sharp, Scientific Games, Medtronic, iGATE, GE, Airtel, Moving Picture Company, TCS, Startek, Gyansys Infotech, Technicolor, Atos, Unisys, Delphi, Huawei, Oracle, Perot Systems , Applied Materials, GalaxE Solutions, First American Corporation and other medium and small sized companies. Outside ITPB, numerous companies have come up like Dell, Tesco, Shell, Aviva, GM, Schneider Electric, Sapient, Goodrich / UTC aerospace and DaimlerChrysler, Symphony Teleca Corp and Tangoe are also located in Whitefield.

History 
ITPB was mooted in 1992 by the then Prime Ministers of India and Singapore, PV Narasimha Rao and Goh Chok Tong respectively, to replicate Singapore's quality infrastructure in India. A consortium of Singapore companies then joined forces with the Tata Group to take on the project. Ascendas has been actively involved in ITPB since its inception in 1996 and has been a lead partner in the Singapore consortium that owns 47 per cent of the ITPL. To that 47 per cent has now been added the 47 per cent of the Tatas, with KIADB continuing to hold its 6 per cent stake. Two Former Chief Ministers of Karnataka - S.M.Krishna, Praven, Former Governor of Karnataka T.N.Chatruvedi & Prime Minister of Singapore Lee Hsien Loong & President S. R. Nathan have inaugurated each of the buildings in various tenures. 

The Park was the first of its kind with the work-live-play environment to be built in India and has since become a role model for other IT Park-like projects in the country.

Education and research
The internationally acclaimed Indian nonprofit research organization the Institute of Bioinformatics (IOB) founded by The Genomics Research Trust and the Johns Hopkins University in Baltimore, Maryland, which is internationally credited for developing databases like NetPath, Human Protein Reference Database, Human Proteinpedia, India Cancer Research Database etc, is situated in this campus.

See also 
 Electronic City
 Economy of Bangalore

References

External links 

 ITPB website

2000 establishments in Karnataka
Software technology parks in Bangalore
Special Economic Zones of India
Intelligent Community Forum